This is a list of notable people who belong to the Hindu Brahmin caste.

Artist 
Kattingeri Krishna Hebbar, artist who received Padma Shri and Padma Bhushan
K. G. Subramanyan, Indian artist who received Padma Shri, Padma Bhushan and Padma Vibhushan
Laxman Pai, Indian artist and Painter who received Padma Shri and Padma Bhushan
M. V. Dhurandhar, Indian artist known for his Post card arts
N. S. Bendre, Indian artist who founded Baroda Group. He received Padma Shri and Padma Bhushan
Ravishankar Raval, Indian artist who received Padma Shri
S.Rajam, Indian artist and Carnatic musician. He is the older brother of Tamil film director and musician S. Balachander and actress S. Jayalakshmi
Y.G. Srimati, Indian artist whose painting figures were Hindu mythology and her style was influenced by Nandalal Bose & frescoes of the Ajanta Caves

Bureaucrats 
Benegal Rama Rau, Indian civil servant who was the 4th governor of the Reserve Bank of India & Ambassador of India to both Japan and USA
Brajesh Mishra, India's first National Security advisor, Indian diplomat for Indian Foreign Service and Prime Minister Atal Bihari Vajpayee's principal secretary
Dhanvanthi Rama Rau, founder and former president of Family Planning Association India
Durga Prasad Dhar, Indian diplomat who was the Ambassador of India to the Soviet Union, minister in Government of J&K and India
Hemant Karkare, Indian Police Service who was the chief of Mumbai Anti-Terrorist Squad. He received Ashoka Chakra
Mannem Nageswara Rao, former-interim director officer Central Bureau of Investigation
Mokshagundam Visvesvarayya, Indian civil engineer and Diwan of Mysore.He was the chief engineer of Krishna Raja Sagara dam. He is considered "Father of Indian Civil Engineering" & received Bharat Ratna
P. N. Dhar, Indian economist who was the head of Indira Gandhi's secretariat and one of her closest advisers. He was awarded Padma Vibhushan
P. N. Haksar, first Principal Secretary to the Prime Minister of India (1971–1973) and deputy chairman of the Planning Commission (1975–1977). He was the first-ever chancellor of Jawaharlal Nehru University
P. V. Gopalan, Indian bureaucrat who served as director of relief measures & refugees in the government of Zambia, advisor to 1st president of Zambia Kenneth Kaunda and as Joint Secretary to the Government of India. He is the grandfather of Kamala Harris
Ravindra Kaushik, Spy & RAW operative famously known as Black Tiger, He is regarded as India's greatest spy to be engaged in Undercover operation at Pakistan armed forces.
R. N. Kao, Indian spymaster and the first founder chief of India's external intelligence agency Research and Analysis Wing.
Satyendra Dubey, IES officer and was the project director in the National Highways Authority of India at Koderma
Sukumar Sen, Indian civil servant who was the first Chief Election Commissioner of India & first Chief Election Commissioner in Sudan.He received Padma Bhushan
Suresh Tendulkar, Indian economist and former chief of the National Statistical Commission. He was a member of Prime Minister Manmohan Singh's Economic Advisory Council
T. N. Seshan, Indian bureaucrat who was the 10th Chief Election Commissioner of India & 18th Cabinet Secretary of India. He received Ramon Magsaysay Award
Triloki Nath Kaul, Indian diplomat who was two times Foreign Secretary of India
Vijay Lakshmi Pandit, Indian diplomat who was the first female governor of Maharashtra and first female president of the United Nations General Assembly
V. K. R. V. Rao, Indian economist and Educator who founded the Delhi school of Economics. He also received Padma Vibhushan

Business 
Business is not much common thing among Brahmins although, there are many exceptions in history. But in the modern world new Brahmin generation preferred business as the future need.
Jaiprakash Gaur  from Gaur Brahmin community (born 1930) is an Indian entrepreneur. He founded and, until his retirement in 2010, was the chairman of Jaypee Group
Dwarkanath Tagore, first Indian industrialists to form an enterprise with British partners. He is the founder of Carr, Tagore and Company.
Deven Sharma, born 1956 in Jharkhand) is an Indian businessmanSharma serves on the boards of CRISIL, The US-China Business Council 
Vijay Shekhar Sharma born July 15, 1978) is an Indian technology entrepreneur and billionaire businessman. He is the Chairman, Managing Director and CEO of One97 Communications and its consumer brand Paytm. He founded Paytm in 2010.
Dilip Dandekar was the chairman and managing director of Kokuyo Camlin Ltd., taking office from June 1, 2002.
Sridhar Vembu (born 1968) is an Indian billionaire business magnate and the founder and CEO of Zoho Corporation.
Abhi Talwalkar was president and CEO of LSI Corporation, a company that designed chips and software for datacenters and other applications.
Manoj Bhargava (born 1953) is an Indian American billionaire businessman and philanthropist. He is the founder and CEO of Innovations Ventures LLC (dba Living Essentials LLC), the company known for producing the 5-hour Energy drink. By 2012 the brand had grown to do an estimated $1 billion in sales. 
Vikrant Bhargava (विक्रान्त भार्गव; born 14 December 1972) is an Indian-born British businessman, and the co-founder and former marketing director of online casino operator PartyGaming.
Indra Nooyi, Indian-American business executive and former CEO of PepsiCo
Sridhar Vembu (born 1968) is an Indian billionaire business magnate and the founder and CEO of Zoho Corporation.
Piyush Pandey is an advertising professional and the Chief Creative Officer Worldwide (2019) and Executive Chairman India of Ogilvy (agency). He is the recipient of the Padma Shri award (2016).
Sheela Gautam, founder and owner of Sheela Foam Limited. She was the Member of Parliament (June 1991 – May 2004).
S. Kasturi Ranga Iyengar was a lawyer, Indian Independence activist and managing director of The Hindu
S. L. Kirloskar, chairman of Kirloskar Group who is the son of Laxmanrao Kirloskar who founded Kirloskar Group
Rakesh Shukla (animal welfare activist), is a Bangalore-based entrepreneur, motivational speaker, and animal welfare activist who runs a home for over 700 rescued dogs.
S. S. Vasan, founder of the Tamil-language magazine Ananda Vikatan and the film production company Gemini Studios
Sudha Murthy, chairperson of the Infosys limited and member of the public health care initiatives of the Gates Foundation. She received Padma Shri.
T. T. Krishnamachari, founder of TTK group and Prestige. He also served as finance minister (1956–1966) and founded NCAER.
T. M. A. Pai, He, along with his brother Upendra Ananth Pai, also established Syndicate Bank originally in Udupi, Karnataka, which has its headquarters now in Manipal and Bangalore. He was responsible for its popular Pigmy Deposit Scheme.
Ammembal Subba Rao Pai (19 November 1852 – 25 July 1909) was a leading lawyer of Mangalore, India. He was the founder of Canara Bank, now one of India's leading banks.
T. V. Ramasubbaiyer, Indian philanthropist & Founder of the popular Tamil daily newspaper Dinamalar
T. V. Sundaram Iyengar, founder of TVS Co
Vittal Mallya, former chairman of United Breweries Group. He is the father of Vijay Mallya.
Ravi Pandit is an Indian businessman and the co-founder and chairman of KPIT Technologies.
Amit Bhardwaj (17 January 1983 – 15 January 2022) was an Indian businessman who founded Amaze Mining and Blockchain Research Limited which ran GB [Gainbitcoin] Miners among other bitcoin-related businesses and projects, these have been described as various types of Ponzi schemes.

Ravi Pandit

Dancers 
 Mrinalini Sarabhai, Indian Classical dancer who founded Darpana Academy of Performing Arts. She received Padma Bhushan & Padma Shri
 Rekha Raju, Indian dancer who was specialised in both Bharatnatyam and Mohiniyattam
 Rukmini Devi, Indian Classical Dancer who catalyzed the renaissance of Bharatanatyam dance. She was the first woman in Indian to be nominated as member of the Rajya Sabha. She received Padma Bhushan
 Sanjukta Panigrahi, Indian Classical dancer who was first Odia woman to embrace ancient classical dance at an early age. She received Padma Shri
Sitara Devi, eminent Indian dancer of classical Kathak style. She received Padma Shri
 Uday Shankar, Indian dancer who is considered as Pioneer of Modern Dance in India. He received Padma Vibhushan
 Vempati Chinna Satyam, Indian dancer who was the guru of the Kuchipudi dance form. He received Padma Bhushan

Film industry

Actors 

Arjun Rampal, Indian actor
Anupam Kher, Indian actor who received Padma Shri and Padma Bhushan. He was the chairman of CBFC, FTII and NSD
Crazy Mohan, Indian actor and comedian
Dharmavarapu Subramanyam, Indian actor and comedian
Gemini Ganesan, Indian actor called "King of Romance" who received Padma Shri
Gollapudi Maruti Rao
Jayaram, Indian actor who received Padma Shri
Jeevan
Kamal Haasan, 60 years in Indian Cinema and still counting. Received Ordre des Arts et des Lettres, Padma Shri and Padma Bhushan. He is the Highest Filmfare achiever and Highest Oscar Submission from India
Major Sundarrajan
Manoj Bajpayee, Indian actor who received Padma Shri
Mohit Raina
Paresh Rawal, Indian actor
Raaj Kumar, Indian film actor who acted in Oscar nominated movie Mother India.
Sanjeev Kumar, Indian actor who is the seventh greatest actor of Indian cinema of all-time in a poll conducted by Rediff.com
Sharman Joshi
Shankar Nag
Sidharth Shukla
Uday Kiran
Unnikrishnan Namboothiri
Y.V Rao

Directors, Cinematographers and producers 

Basu Bhattacharyya, film director
B. V. Karanth, film director who received Padma shri
Dadasaheb Phalke, producer and Father of Indian Cinema.Dadasaheb Phalke Award named after him for lifetime contribution to cinema and is the highest official recognition for film personalities in the country
Girish Karnad, film director who received India's top literary prize, the Jnanpith Award, Padma Shri in 1974 and Padma Bhushan in 1992
Guru dutt, Indian film director and actor. He was included among CNN's "Top 25 Asian Actors" in 2012
G. V. Iyer, Indian film director called "Kannada Bheeshma" who was the only person who made films in Sanskrit
Hrishikesh Mukherjee, film director who received Golden Bear, Padma Vibhushan, NTR National Award and DadaSaheb Phalke Award. Chairman of the CBFC and NFDC
K. Balachander, filmmaker who is called Iyakkunar Sigaram (Director Paramount). He received Padma Shri and DadaSaheb Phalke Award
Kidar Sharma, Indian film director
K. Subramanyam, Indian film director
Nanabhai Bhatt, film director and producer who was the first to feature twins in Indian cinema & Patriarch of Bhatt Film Family.
Puttanna Kanagal, Kannada film director. Puttanna Kanangal Award was named after his contribution
Vivek Agnihotri, film director
V. K. Murthy, first cinematographer to be chosen for the Dadasaheb Phalke Award.

Actress 

Adah Sharma
Aditi Sharma
Deepika Padukone
Divyanka Tripathi, Indian television actress
Dr. Sharmila, Indian television and Film actress
Durga bai Kamat, the first female actor in Indian cinema. She is known for being India's first heroine
Durga Khote, Indian actress who received Padma Shri and Dadasaheb Phalke Award.
Gayathri Raguram, Indian actress and choreographer
Hema Malini, Indian actress who received Padma Shri
Indraja
Kavita Kaushik
Krishna Kumari
Lakshmy Ramakrishnan
Lavanya Tripathi
Leela Chitnis
Madhuri Dixit, Indian actress who received Padma Shri
Madhuvanti Arun
Mamta Kulkarni
Pallavi Sharda, Indian Australian Actress
Rashmi Gautam
Rasika Joshi
Shanta Apte
Shruti Haasan
Sobhita Dhulipala
Soundarya
Soundarya Sharma
Suchitra Sen, Indian actress who received Padma Shri
Sumitra Devi
Trisha
Vasundhara Das
Vidya Balan, Indian actress who received Padma Shri
Yami Gautam

Fashion models and designers 

Bhanu Athaiya, costume designer who was the first Indian to win Oscar award
Kalpana Iyer, model and actress who became runner-up at Miss India 1978 and Miss World 1978 beauty pageant where she was a top 15 semi-finalist.
Nethra Raghuraman, Indian model who won Femina Magazine Look of the Year contest 1997.
Poonam Pandey, erotic model was one of the top 8 contestants of Gladrags 2010 and Kingfisher Calendar Girl Hunt 2011.

Historians and scholars 

 Datto Vaman Potdar, Indian historian and orator who was the vice-chancellor of University of Pune. He received Padma Bhushan and said to be Dr. Johnson of Maharashtra or a living encyclopedia
 K.A. Nilakanta Sastri, Indian historian known for his works on South Indian history. He also received Padma Bhushan.
 Komarraju Venkata Lakshmana Rao, Indian historian
 Madan Mohan Malaviya, Indian scholar and educational reformer. He also received Bharat Ratna
 Natesa Sastri, polyglot, scholar in eighteen languages and authored many books in Tamil, Sanskrit and English
 Pandurang Vaman Kane, Indologist and Sanskrit scholar.He received India's highest civilian award Bharat Ratna
 Ramachandra Guha, Indian historian and writer
 S. Krishnaswami Aiyangar, Indian historian, academician and Dravidologist who earned the title "Dewan Bahadur"
 U. V. Swaminatha Iyer, Tamil Scholar called Tamil Thatha (literally, "Tamil grandfather")

Historical figures 

Charaka an ancient Brahmin physician was one of the principal contributors to Ayurveda, a system of medicine and lifestyle developed in Ancient India.
Sushrut was an ancient Indian physician. The Sushruta Samhita (Sushruta's Compendium), a treatise ascribed to him, is one of the most important surviving ancient treatises on medicine and is considered a foundational text of Ayurveda.
Vagbhata -Kashmiri Brahmin one of the most influential writers, Scientist, Doctor and advisor of ayurveda.  Several works are associated with his name as author, principally the Ashtāṅgasaṅgraha (अष्टाङ्गसंग्रह) and the Ashtāngahridayasaṃhitā.
Aryabhata or Aryabhata I
Pāṇini Since the discovery and publication of his work by European scholars in the nineteenth century, Pāṇini has been considered the "first descriptive linguist",[11] and even labelled as “the father of linguistics.
Varahamihira, a mathematician born around 505 CE and died 587 CE, who was also known for innovation with Pascal's triangle.Varāha or Mihira, was an ancient Indian astrologer, astronomer, and polymath who lived in Ujjain (Madhya Pradesh, India). He was born at Kapitba in a Brahmin family,
Basava,12th-century Indian statesman, philosopher, poet, social reformer and Lingayat saint. Basava Jayanthi is celebrated after him
Bhattadeva (1558–1638), acknowledged as the father of Assamese prose and known for Katha Bhagavat and Katha Gita
Bhai Mati Das, martyr in Sikh history
Bhai Sati Das, was martyred with his brother Bhai Mati Das
Chanakya, teacher of Chandragupta Maurya and also an ancient Indian philosopher, economist, jurist and royal advisor of the Maurya Empire.
Kaundiya, earliest disciple and follower of Gautama Buddha. He was the first to become an Arhat. Koundiny Asana was named after him
Kumārila Bhaṭṭa, was a Hindu philosopher and a scholar of Mimamsa school of philosophy from Kamarupa (present-day Assam)
Mohan Lal Kashmiri, Indian diplomat who played a central role in the First Anglo-Afghan War of 1838–1842
Nana Fadnavis, Influential minister and Statesman of the Maratha Empire during the Peshwa administration.
Samarth Ramdas, Indian Hindu saint, philosopher, poet, writer and spiritual master.
Sariputra, main disciple and First of the Buddha's two chief disciples.
T. Madhava Rao, Diwan of Baroda Indore and Travancore

Rulers & Warriors
Vasudeva Kanva – founder of the Brahmin Kanva dynasty.
Vindhyashakti – founder of the Vakataka dynasty.
Kaundinya I founder of Funan 
Bhabani – Rani/Queen of Natore
Bhavashankari – Rani/Queen of Bhurishrestha
Singai Pararasasegaram most powerful and well known king of Aryacakravarti dynasty.
Cankili II – the self-proclaimed last king of the Jaffna kingdom
Chach of Alor – Hindu king of Sindh and was the founder of Brahman dynasty.
Hemu – Indian king who fought Afghan rebels and Mughal forces of Humayun and Akbar
Devabhuti – last ruler of Shunga empire
Maharaja Gangadhar Rao, 5th Maharaja of Jhansi and Newalkar dynasty
Gangu – Brahmin ruler of the Deccan.
Gautamiputra Satakarni – most successful ruler of Brahmin Satavahana dynasty use the title Eka-brahmana.
Kulasekara Cinkaiariyan – the first of the Aryacakravarti dynasty kings.
Lakshmibai – Rani/Queen of Jhansi
Maharaja Dahir – last Brahmin king of Sindh who sacrificed his life fighting for Hindustan against Arab invasion
Mayurasharma – founder of the Kadamba dynasty.
Pushyamitra Shunga – founder and first ruler of the Shunga Empire.
Raja Ganesha – founder of Ganesha dynasty. He ended the first Ilyas Shahi Dynasty and started Hindu Empire in Bengal
Rudranarayan – Maharaja of Bhurishrestha
Shashanka – Sovereign Emperor of a unified polity in the Bengal region, called the Gauda Kingdom
Rao Nandlal Chaudhary real founder of Indore
Skanda (general) – Commander of prithviraj III army famous for killing Turushkas.
Rajpurohit are a Brahmin community, who as a rule, did not provide Brahminical services as expected with the caste duties of Brahmins Their ancestors are Brahmins of different sub castes
Gopana – was the General of Kumara Kampana II who was the son of Bukka Raya the founder of Vijayanagara Empire
Timmarusu – Minister and general to King Krishnadevaraya the greatest of Vijayanagar Empire monarch. An excellent military strategist and combatant in battles.
 Dadoji Konddeo - administrator of Shahaji's fiefdom and mentor to Shivaji.
Moropant Pingle – Pingle was the Peshwe in Shivaji Maharaj reign excellent warrior and architect accompanied him in many campaigns.
Peshwa Bajirao I – Peshwa of Maratha Empire.
Bhatt Kirat – Poet and warrior general of Guru Hargovind singh ji of sikh empire.
Misr Diwan Chand – A famous general in Khalsa Army of Maharaja Ranjit Singh.
Mahan Singh Mirpuri – Raja Mahan Singh Mirpuri Bali (born in Mirpur,Kashmir) was a famous general in the Sikh Khalsa Army, and was the second-in-command general to General Sardar Hari Singh Nalwa.
Ramayyan Dalawa-Dewan of Travancore state, India, during 1737 and 1756.
Caṇḍeśvara Ṭhakkura Minister and commander served under Karnat dynasty of Mithila region in Bihar.

Indian independence movement 

Vasudev Balwant Phadke(4 November 1845 – 17 February 1883) also known as the ‘Father Of Indian Armed Rebellion’ was an Indian independence activist and revolutionary who sought India's independence from colonial rule.
Pradyot Kumar Bhattacharya 3 November 1913 – 12 January 1933) was a Bengali revolutionary and activist of the Indian freedom movement. He was hanged in Midnapore Central jail.
Bagha Jatin, Indian independence activist strong man killed a tiger once and British officers many times
Yogendra Shukla, Indian freedom fighter and revolutionary.He served in the Cellular Jail (Kalapani), and he was among the founders of Hindustan Socialist Republican Association (HSRA).
Chandra Shekhar Azad, freedom fighter and an Indian revolutionary who reorganised the Hindustan Republican Association (HRA)
Genda Lal Dixit, was an Indian revolutionary who led a group of Indian freedom fighters (revolutionaries), known as the Shivaji Samiti, who engaged in subversive activities against the British Raj.
Chapekar brothers, Indian Revolutionaries who were involved in assassination of W.C. Rand
Pandit Kanshi Ram was an Indian revolutionary who, along with Har Dayal and Sohan Singh Bhakna, was one of the three key members in founding the Ghadar Party.
Rajnarayan Mishra was an Indian socialist and freedom fighter of Indian Independence movement. He gets the last execution of British rule in 1924 in memory of Sir Robert William Douglas Willoughby, Deputy Commissioner of Kheri who was assassinated on 26 August 1920 by Rajnarayan .
Bhai Balmukund (1889 – 11 May 1915) was an Indian revolutionary freedom fighter. He was sentenced to death and hanged by the British Raj for his role in Delhi conspiracy case.  He was a cousin of another revolutionary Bhai Parmanand, who was a founder member of Ghadar Party.
Ram Rakha (1884–1919) was an Indian revolutionary and a member of the Ghadr party from Punjab. He was known primarily for his involvement in the Burma conspiracy case and as a victim of inhuman torture in Cellular Jail.
Nirupama Rath was an Indian freedom fighter, social activist and writer. Dr Rath was one of the founding fellows of the Indian Medical Association.
Mangal Pandey, Hero of 1857 sepoy mutiny and started rebellion
Durgawati Devi, Indian revolutionary and freedom fighter. She is best known for having accompanied Bhagat Singh on the train journey in which he made his escape in disguise after the Saunders killing
Gopal Krishna Gokhale, political guru of Mahatma Gandhi
Indulal Yagnik, Indian independence activist who was the leader of All India Kisan Sabha who lead the Mahagujarat movement
Kamaladevi Chattopadhyay, Indian social reformer and freedom activist. She received Padma Bhushan, Padma Vibhushan and UNESCO honoured her with an award in 1977 for her contribution towards the promotion of handicrafts.
Krishna Nath Sharma, freedom fighter of Assam who opened schools for Dailts.
Anant Laxman Kanhere, was an Indian independence fighter. He was born in a Brahmin family. On 21 December 1909, he shot the Collector of Nashik in British India. The murder of Jackson was an important event in the history.
N. S. Hardikar, freedom fighter and founder of Rashtriya Seva Dal, a voluntary cadre based organisation.
Pingali Venkayya, Indian freedom fighter and who designed Indian first national flag
Jiban Ghoshal was an Indian independence activist and a member of the armed resistance movement led by Masterda Surya Sen, which carried out the Chittagong armoury raid in 1930.
Rajendra Lahiri, Indian revolutionary who was the mastermind behind Kakori conspiracy and Dakshineshwar bombing
Rao Dhansinghji, warrior and freedom fighter born in a Adi-gaur Brahmin family at Charkhi Dadri Haryana fought in the Battle of Nasibpur.
Shivaram Rajguru, an Indian revolutionary from Maharashtra, known mainly for his involvement in the assassination of a British Raj police officer.
Vanchinathan, popularly known as Vanchinathan or Vanchi, was an Indian independence activist. He is best remembered for assassinating Robert Ashe, the Tax Collector of Thirunelveli
Subramaniya Siva
Bapu Gokhale was army chief (Senapati) of the Marathas in the Third Anglo-Maratha War.
Tagadur Ramachandra Rao, Indian freedom fighter and social activist
Tatya Tope, a general in the Indian Rebellion of 1857 and one of its notable leaders.
Jayi Rajaguru was a prominent figure of the Indian independence movement in the state of Odisha Rajaguru. He was later sentenced to death and executed in Baghitota, Midnapore.
Chakhi Khuntia
Vasukaka Joshi
Bhogilal Pandya was a freedom fighter and social worker from Dungarpur in the Indian state of Rajasthan. On 3 April 1976, the Government of India awarded him the Padma Bhushan for his social services.

Journalism 
Balshastri Jambhekar, Indian Journalist considered to be Father of Marathi journalism for his efforts in starting first marathi newspaper Darpan
Bhagwatikumar Sharma, Indian Journalist and Gujarati author.
M. V. Kamath, Indian journalist who was the broadcasting executive and chairman of Prasar Bharati. He received Padma Bhushan
Nidhi Razdan, Indian journalist who was the executive director of NDTV24*7
Rahul Pandita, Indian journalist and author who was Special stories editor of The Hindu. He was also the co founder of Open Magazine
Ramananda Chatterjee, Indian journalist who founded the Modern Review. He is considered as Father of Indian Journalism
Vidya Krishnan, Indian investigate journalist
Rangaraj Pandey, Indian journalist who was the former editor-in-chief Thanthi TV. He is also the founder of Chanakyaa YouTube Channel

Law 
B. N. Rau, Indian Judge of International Court of Justice. He played a key role in drafting the Constitution of India. He was also the president of the UN Security council and Prime minister of Jammu & Kashmir
C. P. Ramaswami Iyer, Advocate General of Madras Presidency & Diwan of Travancore (1936–1947)
V.R. Krishna Iyer, Judge
T. Muthuswamy Iyer, first Indian to become judge of the Madras High Court
Sambhunath Pandit, First Indian to become judge of Calcutta High Court in 1863
Seshadri Srinivasa Iyengar, Indian lawyer who was the Advocate General of Madras Presidency
Madhukar Narhar Chandurkar, former Chief Justice of Bombay and Madras High Court
Mahadev Govind Ranade, Indian Judge of Bombay High court. He was one of the founder of Indian national congress & considered as "Father of Indian Economics". He received Rao Bahadur award
Ganesh Dutt, Indian lawyer who made generous donations from his earnings & development of education in bihar
Bijan Kumar Mukherjea,4th Chief Justice of India
P. B. Gajendragadkar, 7th Chief Justice of India
Kailas Nath Wanchoo, 10th Chief Justice of India
Y. V. Chandrachud,16th Chief Justice of India who is the longest-serving Chief Justice in India
Ranganath Misra, 21st Chief Justice of India and first chairman of the National Human Rights Commission of India

Mathematicians 

A. A. Krishnaswami Ayyangar, Indian mathematician who wrote an article on the difference between Chakravala method and Continued Fractions.
Ashutosh Mukherjee, Indian mathematician, known for his proof of the 25th proposition of Euclid's first book.
Bapudeva Sastri, Indian mathematician who translated the Siddhānta Shiromani.
Bhāskara II, Indian mathematician and astronomer.
C. S. Seshadri, Indian mathematician, known for his proof of the Narasimhan–Seshadri theorem.
Kannan Soundararajan, Indian-American mathematician, professor at Stanford.
Kiran Kedlaya, three-time Putnam Fellow mathematician, professor at University of California, San Diego.
K. R. Parthasarathy, Indian mathematician, a pioneer of quantum stochastic calculus and professor emeritus at the Indian Statistical Institute.
Madhava of Sangamagrama, Indian mathematician known for discovery of power series Expansions of trigonometric Sine, Cosine and Arctangent functions Infinite series summation formulae for π.
Nilakantha Somayaji, Indian mathematician who discussed  infinite series expansions of trigonometric functions and  problems of algebra and spherical geometry.
Parameshvara Nambudiri, Indian mathematician and Astronomer who discovered Drigganita and Parameshvara circumradius formula.
Rudranath Capildeo, mathematician and politician of Trinidad and Tobago.
Shakuntala Devi, Indian mathematician popularly known as the "Human Computer". 
Sissa, Indian mathematician who invented  Chaturanga, the Indian predecessor of chess.
Srinivasa Ramanujan, Greatest Indian mathematician who compiled Ramanujan prime, the Ramanujan theta function, partition formulae and mock theta functions and made substantial contributions to mathematical analysis, number theory, infinite series, and continued fractions.
S. R. Srinivasa Varadhan, Indian-American mathematician who received Abel Prize for his fundamental contributions to probability theory and in particular for creating a unified theory of large deviation.
Varāhamihira, Indian astronomer and mathematician who discovered a version of Pascal's triangle and worked on Magic squares.

Military 
Bhandari Ram VC (24 July 1919 – 19 May 2002) was an Indian recipient of the Victoria Cross, the highest and most prestigious award for gallantry in the face of the enemy.

Somnath Sharma, first recipient of India's highest gallantry award Param Vir Chakra
Captain Lakshmi Sahgal, Officer of the Indian National Army, and the Minister of Women's Affairs in the Azad Hind government. She received Padma Vibushan
Commodore Kasargod Patnashetti Gopal Rao, Indian Navy officer who received Maha Vir Chakra & Vishisht Seva Medal
Jayanto Nath Chaudhuri, 5th Chief of Army Staff of Indian Army (1962–1966). After his retirement he served as the Indian High Commissioner to Canada. He received Padma Vibhushan
Gopal Gurunath Bewoor, 8th Chief of Army Staff (1973–1975). He received Padma Bhushan and Param Vishisht Seva Medal
Tapishwar Narain Raina, 9th Chief of the Army Staff of Indian Army (1975–1978). He received Padma Bhushan and Maha Vir Chakra
K. V. Krishna Rao, 11th Chief of Army Staff of Indian Army (1981–1983) and former governor of Jammu and Kahsmir, Nagaland, Manipur and Tripura.He received Param Vishisht Seva Medal
Krishnaswamy Sundarji, 13th Chief of Army Staff of Indian Army (1986–1988) and last former British Indian Army officer to command the Indian Army. He received Param Vishisht Seva Medal.
Vishwa Nath Sharma, 14th Chief of the Army Staff of the Indian Army (1988–1990). He received Param Vishisht Seva Medal & Ati Vishisht Seva Medal
Bipin Chandra Joshi, 16th Chief of Army Staff of the Indian Army (1993–1994). He received Param Vishisht Seva Medal & Ati Vishisht Seva Medal

Musicians 

, 

Bharadwaj, composer
Bhimsen Joshi, singer
C. Ramchandra, Indian music director and playback singer
D. K. Pattammal, Indian Carnatic Musician who was the first woman to have performed Ragam Thanam Pallavi (male stronghold) in concerts. She has received Padma Vibhushan and Padma Bhushan
Jasraj
Jitendra Abhisheki, Indian vocalist who received Padma Shri
Kalki Sadasivam, Indian singer and husband of M. S. Subbulakshmi.
Kishore Kumar, Indian playback singer and actor
K. V. Narayanaswamy, Indian musician and carnatic vocalist who received Padma Shri
M. Balamuralikrishna
Nandikeshvara,the author of the Abhinaya Darpana lit. 'The Mirror of Gesture'
Palghat Mani Iyer
Parassala B. Ponnammal, Indian Carnatic musician who was the first woman student at Swathi Thirunal College of Music. She has received Padma Shri.
Ravi Shankar, Indian sitar virtuoso and a composer. He received 5 Grammy awards, Padma Bhushan, Padma Vibhushan and Bharat Ratna
Shankar Mahadevan, singer
Śārṅgadeva was the 13th-century Indian musicologist who authored Sangita Ratnakara
S. P. Balasubrahmanyam, singer
Subbudu, Indian Music and dance critic
Tansen, Indian musician and composer who was prominent in Hindustani classical music
Thyagaraja, composer
T. M. Krishna, Indian Carnatic vocalist, writer, activist and author
Udit Narayan, Indian playback singer who received Order of Gorkha Dakshina Bahu, Padma Shri and Padma Bhushan
Upendra Kumar, Kannada music director
Vaali, Indian lyricist and poet. He received Padma Shri
V. Dakshinamoorthy, Carnatic musician, composer and music director
Venkataramana Bhagavathar, composer of Carnatic music
Zubeen Garg, singer

Nobel laureates

Poets 

Agyeya, Indian poet and writer who received Jnanpith Award & Golden Wreath Award
Banabhatta wrote india's first novel and was a poet in King Harsha's court
Bankim Chandra Chattopadhyay, Indian Poet who wrote india's national song Vande Matram
D. R. Bendre
Garimella Satyanarayana, Telugu poet and freedom fighter
Gopalakrishna Adiga, Kannada poet who is known as "Pioneer of New style" poetry
Goswami Tulsidas, the author of the epic poem Ramcharitmanas.
Jayadeva
Kapilar, Tamil poet o Sangam period who contributed 10% of Sangam Era classical corpus
Kavi Pradeep, Indian poet and songwriter who is best known for his patriotic song "Aye Mere Watan Ke Logo". He received Dada Saheb Phalke Award.
M. Govinda Pai, Kannada poet who received first Rashtrakavi title by the Madras Government
Muthuswami Dikshitar, Indian poet and composer
Narsinh Mehta, Gujarati Saint poet who is considered as Adi Kavi. His bhajan Vaishnav Jan To was Mahatma Gandhi's favourite
Poonthanam Nambudiri, Malayalam poet who is remembered for Jnanappana which means "the song of divine wisdom" in Malayalam
Puttaparthi Narayanacharyulu, Telugu poet who received Padma Shri
Rajendra Bhandari, Indian Nepalese poet
Sambandar, Tamil Shaiva Poet and who was one of the 63 Nayanars who composed 16,000 hymns
Sri Sri, Indian poet who is known for his works in Telugu literature and anthology Maha Prasthanam
Subramani Bharathi, Tamil poet popularly known as "Mahakavi Bharathi" ("Great Poet Bharathi"), he was a pioneer of modern Tamil poetry
Suryakant Tripathi, Indian poet, novelist, essayist and story-writer.
Tikkana, Telugu poet who was the second poet of the Kavi Trayam that translated Mahabharata into Telugu
Veturi, Indian poet and lyricist
Vidyapati, Maithili and Sanskrit poet, composer, writer, courtier and royal priest
Viswanatha Satyanarayana, Telugu poet who has received Padma Bhushan & Jnanpith Award
Yogmaya Neupane, Nepali poet considered pioneer of female Nepali poets

Politicians

Political party founders 
 Dattopant Thengadi, Indian Hindu Ideologue who founded Swadeshi Jagaran Manch, Bharatiya Mazdoor Sangh & Bharatiya Kisan Sangh
Hargovind Pant, Indian politician who founded Kumaon Parishad political group and was also the Deputy Speaker of United Province
Kanu Sanyal, Indian politician who was the founding member of Communist Party of India (Marxist–Leninist)
 K. B. Hedgewar, founder of the Rashtriya Swayamsevak Sangh (RSS)
Motilal Nehru Indian politician who was the 36th president of Indian congress.He co founded Swaraj Party
 Shripad Amrit Dange, co-founder of Communist Party of India. He was the Member of the Indian Parliament for Bombay Central and Central South
 Surendranath Banerjee, Indian politician who was the 11th president of Indian congress. He founded Indian National association and also co founded Indian National congress.He was the First Indian to qualify for Indian Civil Services Examination
 Syama Prasad Mukherjee, minister of industry and supply. He was the founder of Bharathiya Jana Sangh (predecessor of BJP)
 Womesh Chunder Bonnerjee, co-founder and First President of Indian National Congress.

Ministers, MPs and MLAs 

Ananth Kumar, Cabinet minister of Government of India (2014–2018)
Arindam Bhattacharya (politician), Member of Legislative Assembly(MLA) from the West Bengal Legislative Assembly and president of the West Bengal unit of All India Brahman Mahasabha founded by Pandit Madan Mohan Malviya in 1939
Arun Jaitley, Indian politician and attorney, Minister of Finance (2014–2019).
Deendayal Upadhyaya, Indian politician who was the 10th President of Bharatiya Jana Sangh
Deepak Bharadwaj, Indian politician belonging to Bahujan Samaj Party (BSP). Bhardwaj had contested for 15th Lok Sabha from the West Delhi Constituency
Girdhari Lal Bhargava, Indian politician who was the Member of Legislative Assembly and Member of Parliament of Rajasthan
Gopal Jee Thakur, Indian Politician, Member of Parliament, lok Sabha from Darbhanga,Bihar. (Born. 1969)
H. R. Bhardwaj, 27th Minister of Law and Justice, former Governor of Karnataka and Kerala
Jana Krishnamurthi, Indian politician who was the former Union Law minister and 6th president of Bharathiya Janata Party
Kanaiyalal Maneklal Munshi, Indian politician who was the 3rd Minister of Agriculture and 2nd Governor of Uttar Pradesh. He is the Founder of Bharathiya Vidya Bhavan
K. S. Sudarshan was the Fifth Chief/Sarsanghachalak of the Rashtriya Swayamsevak Sangh
Madhukar Dattatraya Deoras popularly known as Balasaheb Deoras, was the third Chief/Sarsanghchalak of Rashtriya Swayamsevak Sangh
M. S. Golwalkar better known as Guruji was the second Chief/Sarsanghchalak of Rashtriya Swayamsevak Sangh
P. Ramamurthi, Indian politician who was Member of Parliament and politburo member of Communist Party of India (Marxist)
Prakash Pant, Indian Politician who was the MLA Speaker & Finance Minister of Uttarakhand Legislative assembly
Pramod Mahajan, minister in the government of Vajpayee
Prem Nath Dogra, Leader of Jammu & Kashmir known as Sher-e-Duggar.He was also the president of Bharatiya Jana Sangh (1955)
Rahul Easwar, Indian right-wing activist, philosophy author and orator
Rahul Gandhi, Indian politician
Rajendra Trivedi, speaker of Gujarat Legislative Assembly
Sanjay Jha, former national spokesperson for the Indian National Congress
Satish Sharma, Indian politician who was the Minister of Petroleum & Natural Gas (1993–1996) and MP of Uttar Pradesh (2010–2016)
Shreedhar Mahadev Joshi, Indian politician who was the Member of Parliament, and leader of Samyukta Maharashtra Samiti
Somnath Chatterjee, Indian politician who was the 14th Speaker of the Lok Sabha and Member of Parliament (1985–2009)
Subhas Chakraborty, Indian politician who was the MLA, Minister of Transport, Minister of Sports & Youth Affairs and Minister of Tourism Government of West Bengal
Subramanian Swamy, Indian politician, Member of Parliament, Rajya Sabha
Uma Shankar Dikshit, Indian politician who was the 12th Governor of West Bengal,7th Governor of Karnataka & 10th Minister of Home Affairs. He received Padma Vibhushan
U. Srinivas Mallya, Indian politician who served as Member of Parliament for an 18-year tenure from 1946 to 1965
Vasant Sathe, former Union Minister of Information and Broadcasting and he initiated process which led to Indian television moving into colour broadcasting for Asian Games 1982 and Hum Log the first colour Indian soap-opera.
Vijay Mishra, represents the Gyanpur constituency in the Legislative Assembly of Uttar Pradesh
Vinayak Damodar Savarkar, Indian politician who played developed tbe Hindtuva Ideology. He was leading figure in Hindu Mahasabha

Chief ministers

Presidents of India

Prime Ministers of India

Professionals 
Anant Pai (Uncle Pai), pioneer of Indian Comics whose famous work includes Amar Chitra Katha and Tinkle
Daya Nayak, Indian police inspector and detective who is fame for being Encounter specialist. He has gunned down more than 80 criminals in Mumbai Underworld.
Dhan Gopal Mukerji, Indian Man of Letters who was the first Indian in United States to win Newbery Medal in 1928
Ganapati Chakraborty, Indian magician who is considered to be the pioneer of Bengal modern magic. He was the mentor of P. C. Sorcar & K Lal
Jagannath Shankarseth, Indian philanthropist and educationalist
Kanaka Murthy, Indian sculptor who received Jakanachari Award
Neerja Bhanot, Indian flight attendant who died while saving passengers on Pan Am Flight 73. She received Ashoka Chakra & Nishan-e-Pakistan for her bravery
R. K. Laxman, Indian cartoonist who received Padma Bhushan, Padma Vibhushan and Ramon Magsaysay Award
Samay Raina, Indian YouTuber and Stand – Up Comedian
Shashi Kant, IPS officer and former DGP of Punjab. He played a major role against Illegal drug trade

Rishi (Sages) 

Agastya, Rig Vedic Sage
Atri, Rig Vedic Sage
Bharadvaja, one of the Saptrishi
Bharata Muni, Vedic Sage who wrote Natya shastra & regarded as the father of Indian theatrical art forms
Bhrigu, The first compiler of predictive astrology, and also the author of Bhrigu Samhita, the astrological classic.
Chandrashekarendra Saraswati known as the Sage of Kanchi or Mahaperiyava (meaning "The great elder')
Jaimini, Vedic Sage and founder of Mimamsa philosophy of hinduism
Kashyapa, Rig vedic Sage
Marichi, Father of Maharishi Kashyap and the founder of Vedanta
Valmiki, Author of Ramayan
Vashishta, First rishi of Vedanta
Ved Vyas, Author of Mahabharat and Puranas

Science, technology, engineering 

Anandi Gopal Joshi, one of the first Indian female doctors who practiced with a degree in Western medicine
C. N. R. Rao, Indian chemist and material scientist, former director of the Indian Institute of Science, specialising in  solid-state and structural chemistry.
Dwarkanath Kotnis (1910–1949), Indian physician and one of the five Indian physicians dispatched to China to provide medical assistance during the Second Sino-Japanese War in 1938.
G. N. Ramachandran, Indian physicist who created Ramachandran plot for understanding peptide structure. He was the first to propose a triple-helical model for the structure of collagen
Iravatham Mahadevan, Indian epigraphist known for his decipherment of Tamil-Brahmi inscriptions and for his expertise of Indus Valley civilisation
Irawati Karve, First woman Anthropologist of India
Janaki Ammal, Indian botanist whose notable work involved studies on sugarcane and the eggplant. She received Padma Shri
Kadambini Ganguly, one of the first Indian female doctors who practiced with a degree in Western medicine
K. S. Krishnan, Indian physicist who was the co-discoverer of Raman scattering and mentor of C. V. Raman. He also received Padma Bhushan
Shyamala Gopalan, Indian American biomedical scientist and mother of vice president of United States Kamala Harris
Udupi Ramachandra Rao, former ISRO chairman and one of the pioneer of Indian satellite development programme (developed India's first satellite Aryabhata)
Yellapragada Subbarow, Indian biochemist

Social sciences 

Agnivesh, Indian social activist and the founder of Arya Sabha
Arya Pallam, Social reformer, communist, feminist from Kerala who fought against the oppression of upper class (Brahman) women
Dhondo Keshav Karve, social reformer who built India's first school for widows and first university for women. He also received Bharat Ratna.
Girish Prabhune, Indian social worker whose works included towards upliftment of the nomadic Pardhi community. He received Padma Shri
G. S. Ghurye, Sociology Professor & considered Founder of Indian Sociology
Ishwar Chandra Vidyasagar, Indian educator and social reformer considered the "father of Bengali prose".
Jaya Arunachalam, Indian social worker and the founder of Working Women's Forum. She received Padma Shri.
Jiddu Krishnamurti, Indian philosopher, speaker and writer
Jnanadanandini Devi, social reformer who influenced the earliest phase of women's empowerment in 19th century Bengal
Laxmi Narayan Tripathi, Indian LGBT activist who was the first transgender person to represent Asia Pacific in the UN in 2008 and also the Acharya Mahamandaleshwar of
M. N. Srinivas, Indian sociologist and anthropologist who worked on the Caste System and the concept of 'Dominant Caste'. He received Padma Bhsushan.
Nanaji Deshmukh, social reformer and politician. He received Padma Vibhushan and Bharat Ratna
Shiv Narayan Agnihotri, founder of Dev Samaj
Priyamvada Gopal, professor at University of Cambridge
Ram Mohan Roy, co-founder of the Brahmo Sabha and the precursor of the Brahmo Samaj,
R. S. Subbalakshmi (Sister Subbalakshmi) Indian Social Reformer who received Padma Shri
T. M. A. Pai, founder of India's first private medical school Kasturba Medical College who established Manipal Institute of Technology. He received Padma Shri
Traffic Ramaswamy
U. G. Krishnamurti, Indian speaker and spiritual writer

Spiritual gurus 

Adi Shankara
Abhinavagupta, Kashmiri shaiv philosopher
Anukulchandra Chakravarty, Indian Guru who was the founder Satsang (Deoghar)
Ashutosh
Brahmananda Saraswati
Chaitanya Mahaprabhu considered to be Avatar of Radhe Krishna.He founded Gaudiya Vaishnavism & composed Shikshashtakam
Dayanand Saraswati, founder of Arya Samaj
Eknath, according to legend
Dyaneshwar
Gopalanand Swami
Krishnananda Saraswati
Mandan Mishra, Mimansic philosopher who debated with adi shankara
Madhvacharya
Nagarjuna, one of the most important buddhist philosopher
Neem Karoli Baba
Nimbarkacharya, Vaishnav vedantic philosopher
Raghavan N. Iyer
 Ramakrishna
Ramananda, founder of Ramanandi/Vairagi Samprada and prominent saint of Bhakti movement.
Ramanujacharya
Sarada Devi
Sitaramdas Omkarnath said to be Divine Incarnate/Avatar of Kali Yuga
Sri Chinmoy, Indian guru who established first meditation center in Queens, New York.He started the Peace Run movement
Swami Haridas, Vaishnav saint who established Bankey Bihari temple.
Swami Ramanand
Tibbetibaba
Upasni Maharaj
Vallabha Acharya, founder of Pushtimarg Samprada

Sports 

Vijay Kumar (sport shooter)Honorary Captain Vijay Kumar Sharma, AVSM, SM (born 19 August 1985) is an Indian sport shooter. He won the silver medal in the individual 25 metre rapid fire pistol event at the 2012 Summer Olympics. 
Ajit Wadekar, Indian cricketer considered to be an aggressive batsman. He received Arjuna Award and Padma Shri
Ashok Mankad
D. B. Deodhar, former Indian cricketer
Dilip Sardesai, Indian Cricketer. He is the father of Journalist Rajdeep Saradesai
Ishant Sharma
Vishesh Bhriguvanshi born 13 November 1991) is an Indian professional basketball player who is the captain of the Indian National Basketball Team and, most recently, a player with the Adelaide 36ers of the National Basketball League (NBL). Bhriguvanshi was awarded the Arjuna Award by Govt. of India for the year 2020.
Kilvidi Seshachari, Indian wicket keeper who was the member of first Indian cricket team to tour England in 1911
Kirti Azad, Indian Cricketer turned politician who was the Member of Parliament Lok Sabha
Lala Amarnath, first batsman ever to score a century for India in Test cricket. He received Padma Bhushan
Madhav Apte, Indian Cricketer
Mihir Sen, first Indian swimmer to conquer English Channel and record in Guinness Book of Records as the "world's greatest long distance swimmer". He received Padma Bhushan and Padma Shri
Mukundrao Pai, Indian Cricketer and Captain on tour of England in 1911. He was the first Indian to score a century in First class debut
Prakash Padukone, Indian badminton player who was the World no.1 player during 1980. He received Padma Shri and Arjuna award
Subramanian Badrinath
Anjum Moudgil born 5 January 1994) is an Indian sport shooter. She is from Chandigarh and represents Punjab. She is supported by GoSports Foundation through the Rahul Dravid Athlete Mentorship Programme.
Suresh Raina, former Indian cricketer
Yogeshwar Dutt(born 2 November 1982) is an Indian freestyle wrestler. At the 2012 Summer Olympics, he won the bronze medal in the 60 kg category. He was awarded the Padma Shri by the Government of India in 2013. He won gold medals at the 2010 and the 2014 Commonwealth Games. He is one of only 5 male wrestlers in India to win an Olympic medal.
Manish Kaushik born 11 January 1996) is an Indian boxer who completes in the lightweight division. Manish won gold at the 2017 National Boxing Games. Manish Kaushik later went to represent India in 2018 Commonwealth Games, winning the silver medal.

Writers 
Abburi Chayadevi, Telugu fictional writer
Bharathi Mukherjee, Indian American-Canadian writer who was the first naturalized citizen to win the National Book Critics Circle Award
C. K. Prahalad, Indian American Author who received Pravasi Bharatiya Samman and Padma Bhushan
Gurajada Apparao, Indian playwright who was given title Kavisekhara and Abyudaya Kavitha Pithamahudu
Hazari Prasad Dwivedi – Hindi author, novelist, literary historian, essayist, critic and scholar. He received Padma Bhushan
Kalhana, Indian author of Rajatarangini (River of Kings), an account of the History of Kashmir.
Kandukuri Veeresalingam, Indian writer who is considered Father of Telugu Renaissance movement
Kalki Krishnamurthy, Indian writer whose notable works include Ponniyin Selvan and Sivagamiyin Sabadham
Lalithambika Antharjanam, Indian author and social reformer best known for her literary works in Malayalam language
Mahasweta Devi, Indian writer who received Jnanpith Award, Ramon Magsaysay Award, Padma Shri and Padma Vibhushan
Mamoni Raisom Goswami, Indian writer who received Padma Shri, Jnanpith Award and Prince Claus Fund
Manilal Nabhubhai Dwivedi, Gujarati-language writer, philosopher, and social thinker from British India
Masti Venkatesha Iyengar
Padma Lakshmi, Indian American author and Television Host.
Parithimar Kalaignar, Tamil professor who was the first to campaign Tamil as Classical language and first to use the term Kumari Kandam
P. N. Oak, Indian writer
Pralhad Keshav Atre, Indian writer popularly known as Acharya Atre
Rahul Sankrityayan, Indian author who spent 45 years of his life on travels away from home & considered "Father of Indian travelogue"  He received Padma Bhushan
Rajam Krishnan
R. K. Narayan, Indian writer who received Benson Medal, Padma Bhushan and Padma Vibhushan
Seepersad Naipaul, Indo-Trinidadian writer
 Shardha Ram Phillauri – Indian writer of the Hindu religious hymn "Om Jai Jagdish Hare" and Bhagyawati, one of the first Hindi novels.
Shivaram Karanth, Indian polymath and novelist. He received Jnanpith Award for Kannada
Somadeva, Indian writer who was the author of a famous compendium of Indian legends, fairy tales and folk tales – the Kathasaritsagara
Sushma Joshi, Nepalese fiction & non-fictional writer
U. R. Ananthamurthy, Indian writer who has received Padma Bhushan and Jnanpith Award.
Vijay Tendulkar, Indian playwright. He received Padma Bhushan.
Vishnubhat Godse, Indian travelogue writer known for Maza Pravas

Yogi 
B.K.S. Iyengar , Indian Yoga guru who founded "Iyengar Yoga style".He received Padma Shri, Padma Bhushan & Padma Vibhushan
Chidananda Saraswati, Indian yogi who was president of the Divine Life Society
Dhirendra Brahmachari
K. Pattabhi Jois
Lahiri Mahasaya
Lokenath Brahmachari
Sivananda Saraswati
Swaminarayan
Swami Rama
Tirumalai Krishnamacharya, Indian yoga guru who is considered as "Father of Modern Yoga"

See also 

List of Brahmin dynasties and states
List of Gaud Saraswat Brahmins
List of Deshastha Brahmins
List of Chitpawan Brahmins
List of Karhade Brahmins
List of Iyengars
List of Iyers
List of Madhva Brahmins
List of Saraswats

References

Bibliography

 

Lists of Indian people by community
Brahmins